Ceallaigh is a surname. Notable people with the surname include:

 Royal House Ceallaigh
 Fiachra Ó Ceallaigh O.F.M. (18 August 1933 –), an Irish Catholic Bishop
 Gilla Ceallaigh Ua Cleirigh (dies 1003), king of Ui Fiachrach Aidhne
 Giolla Ceallaigh mac Comhaltan (fl. 10th century), a member of the Uí Fiachrach Aidhne of south Galway
 Mícheál Ó Ceallaigh (fl. late 19th century), an Irish scribe
 Muircheartach mac Pilib Ó Ceallaigh (died 1407), Archbishop of Tuam and patron of An Leabhar Ua Maine
 Philip Ó Ceallaigh, Irish short story writer living in Bucharest
 Seán Ó Ceallaigh disambiguation page
 Seán Ó Ceallaigh (Clare politician) (1896–1994), Irish Fianna Fáil politician
 Tomás mac Muircheartaigh Ó Ceallaigh, O.P., Archbishop of Tuam, 1438 to 1441